Juan Cruz Zurbriggen (born 12 May 2000) is an Argentine professional footballer who plays as a forward for San Telmo, on loan from Colón.

Career
Zurbriggen's youth career got underway with Libertad de Clucellas, prior to joining fellow hometown team Sportivo Libertad in 2013. After also playing for Florida de Clucellas on a dual registration contract, he moved to Atlético de Rafaela's academy in 2014. In 2016, Colón signed Zurbriggen. July 2018 saw Eduardo Domínguez give the forward his first sight of first-team football as he was an unused substitute for a Copa Argentina win over Deportivo Morón. In the following April, under new manager Pablo Lavallén, Zurbriggen came off the bench in the club's inaugural match of the Copa de la Superliga versus Tigre; which finished goalless. In June 2022, Zurbriggen joined Nacional Primera side San Telmo on a loan deal until the end of 2023.

Career statistics
.

Notes

References

External links

2000 births
Living people
People from Castellanos Department
Argentine footballers
Association football forwards
Argentine Primera División players
Club Atlético Colón footballers
San Telmo footballers
Sportspeople from Santa Fe Province